Adel Ahmed Abdullah (born 12 January 1984), commonly known as Adel Abdullah, is a Syrian footballer who plays for Sur SC in Oman Professional League.

Club career

Nizwa
In 2014, he moved to Oman where he signed a one-year contract with Oman 1st Division club, Nizwa Club. On 26 January 2015, he was released by Nizwa Club.

Sur
On 26 January 2015, he signed a six-month contract with Oman Professional League club, Sur SC.

International career
Adel Abdullah is currently a member of the Syria national football team.
He made 6 appearances for the Syria national football team during the qualifying rounds of the 2010 FIFA World Cup.

Career statistics

Club performance

Appearances in major competitions

Goals for senior national team
Scores and results table. Syria's goal tally first:

Honours

Club

Al-Jaish
AFC Cup: 2004

References

External links
 

1984 births
Living people
Sportspeople from Damascus
Syrian footballers
Syria international footballers
Syrian expatriate footballers
Association football midfielders
2011 AFC Asian Cup players
Al-Jaish Damascus players
Al-Ittihad Aleppo players
Shanghai Shenxin F.C. players
Al-Karamah players
Sur SC players
Oman Professional League players
Chinese Super League players
Expatriate footballers in China
Syrian expatriate sportspeople in China
Expatriate footballers in Oman
Syrian expatriate sportspeople in Oman
Syrian Premier League players